Hon. Goni Bukar Lawan was a Nigerian politician and a former member of the House of Representatives, representing Bursari/Geidam/Yunusari House of Assembly. He was a Commissioner of Youth, Sports, Social, and Community Development in the cabinet of Governor Mai Mala Buni from 2019 until his death in 2022. He was a member of the All Progressive Congress (APC).

He was traveling to Kano from Damaturu when he had an accident and died at Damban General Hospital, in Bauchi State, Nigeria.

See also
Nigerian National Assembly delegation from Yobe
2019 Nigerian House of Representatives elections in Yobe State
List of members of the House of Representatives of Nigeria, 2007–2011

References

20th-century births
2022 deaths
People from Yobe State
Nigerian politicians
National Assembly (Nigeria) delegations by state
Yobe State House of Representatives elections
House of Representatives
2019 Nigerian House of Representatives elections
Year of birth missing